William Ian McDonald (15 March 1933 – 13 December 2006) was a New Zealand neurologist and academic. Having taught and practiced in New Zealand and the United States, he was Professor of Neurology at the Institute of Neurology of the University of London, England, from 1974 to 1998. He was the world leading authority on multiple sclerosis (MS) in the second half of the twentieth-century: the McDonald criteria used to diagnose MS are named after him.
He earned Bachelors of Medical Science at the University of Otago in Dunedin (1955), MBChB with Distinction (1957) and PhD (1962). MBChB is a Bachelor of Medicine and Bachelor of Surgery degrees a degree awarded after 5 years of what is analogous to a combined undergraduate-graduate course of study.  Such degrees can be awarded in the U.K. and other countries (such as New Zealand and South Africa). McDonald's doctoral thesis work dealt with experimental neuropathy in cats induced by diphtheria toxin. It was conducted at the Department of Physiology under the supervision of Professor Archie McIntyre. 
He lectured widely  both in the United Kingdom and abroad. He received, in 1968, a fellowship of the Royal Australian College of Physicians, in 1972 of the London Royal College of Physicians, in 1989 of the Royal College of Ophthalmologists in 1989, and in 1999 of the Academy of Medical Sciences. Accolades for his work included 15 prizes for multiple sclerosis research, a dozen honorary fellowships, and honorary membership of 10 overseas neurological associations.

References

1933 births
2006 deaths
New Zealand neurologists
New Zealand academics
Academics of the University of London
Multiple sclerosis
New Zealand medical researchers
Members of the National Academy of Medicine